The Football Association of Greenland (Greenlandic: Kalaallit Nunaanni Isikkamik Arsaattartut Kattuffiat) (KAK) is the governing body of association football in the island country of Greenland. The KAK was founded on 4 July 1971. It runs the men's national team, women's national team, men's futsal team and multiple national championships, from the men's and women's national championships through youth, veterans and futsal variations. Greenland also held three editions of a men's national football friendly tournament, known as the Greenland Cup, from 1980 to 1984. The Greenland Football Association applied to join CONCACAF, a continental body of FIFA, in June 2022.

Overview

Greenland is not a member of FIFA (as of February 2023) and therefore cannot play in the FIFA World Cup. In addition to FIFA, Greenland is neither a member of CONCACAF (although they have put in an application to join) or UEFA. This is because Greenland cannot sustain a grass pitch due to the permafrost which envelops Greenland. An artificial grass pitch was laid at Nuuk Stadium in 2016, which FIFA now allows, but the stadium still lacks other required features. Following the entry of Gibraltar into UEFA and later FIFA, Greenland may be the next to try to enter. However, the organization did join the Confederation of Independent Football Associations (ConIFA) in May 2016. After internal changes to ConIFA and the association's lack of ability to participate in competitions, they withdrew from the organisation by January 2020, with them being unlisted on the ConIFA site from around May 2020. With the update of UEFA's statutes to forbid the admission of football associations from non-independent regions, Greenland found their path to UEFA membership closed. As of 2022, they have decided to apply to the other confederation which they would be eligible to do so, CONCACAF, in the hopes that this would prove more successful.

Football is the most popular sport in Greenland with about 5,500 players, out of a population of ~55,000. The Greenland Football Federation was started in 1971 and they have their office in Nuuk. In Greenland, football can usually be played outside from the end of May until the middle of September, with the south of Greenland able to play for longer than in the north. Initially, all the football grounds were sand pitches or gravel pitches, with this limiting the quality of the football that could be played. However, many pitches were upgraded as part of FIFA's Goal Program, which allowed for several artificial pitches to be constructed. Today there are such pitches in Nuuk, Qeqertarsuaq, Sisimiut, Uummannaq, Nanortalik and more. Many towns also have indoor halls and the football players play indoor football from October to about April, with futsal being a popular sport. Greenland are building more indoor stadiums so the game can be played all year round and under FIFA requirements, this is similar to what Iceland have accomplished in recent history.

KAK Presidency
???  (1971-2011)
Lars Lundblad (2011-?)
John Thorsen (?-2019)
Finn Meinel (2019-?)
???

See also
Greenland national football team
Greenlandic Football Championship
Sport in Greenland

References

External links
The International Football Union: Umbrella Association of the GBU

Football in Greenland
Sports organisations of Greenland
Sports organizations established in 1971
Association football governing bodies in North America